BC  Ekaterinburg is a Russian women's basketball team based in Yekaterinburg competing in the Russian Premier League, and until February 2022 in  FIBA Europe's EuroLeague Women. In reaction to the 2022 Russian invasion of Ukraine, in February 2022 EuroLeague Women suspended all Russian clubs, including UMMC.

Founded in 1938 as Zenit Sverdlovsk, the club had its name changed to Uralmash Sverdlovsk in 1960, like other teams from the city such as FC Ural Sverdlovsk Oblast. Four years later Uralmash reached the Soviet Top Division. In 1973 and 1974 it attained two 3rd spots, the club's best results in the Soviet era.

After Uralmash was merged into OMZ the club was bought in 2000 by the newly formed company UMMC, adopting its current name. UMMC Ekaterinburg in 2002 won its first national championship. The following year it won the Euroleague in its debut season, becoming the first Russian team to win the top European trophy. The team also defended its national title, making it a double.

UMMC wasn't able to win the championship in the following five seasons with the rise of VBM-SGAU Samara and Spartak Moscow Region. In 2009 it began a new successful period, winning three doubles in a row. Spartak ultimately blocked its path to the Euroleague final, defeating UMMC in the Final Four's semi-finals in all four seasons 2008–11.

After the Russian invasion of Ukraine on February 24, 2022, American-Hungarians Courtney Vandersloot (who led the team in assists) and Allie Quigley (who was second on the team in points), Bahamian-Bosnian Jonquel Jones (who led the team in points and rebounds), and Spanish player Alba Torrens left the team. Seven days earlier, on February 17, American two-time Olympic champion Brittney Griner was arrested on drug charges in Russia by the Russian Federal Security Service. On August 4th, 2022 she was sentenced to 9 years in prison and there was concern that Russia would hold her hostage as a response to the Western sanctions imposed against Russia in response to the Russian invasion of Ukraine. Ultimately, she was released on December 8 in a prisoner exchange with Russian arms dealer Viktor Bout, who had served ten years of a 25-year sentence.

Titles
 4 SuperCup (2013, 2016, 2018, 2019)    
 6 Euroleague (2003, 2013, 2016, 2018, 2019, 2021)      
 15 Russian Leagues (2002, 2003, 2009-21)
 9 Russian Cups (2005, 2009-14, 2017, 2019)

Current roster

Former players

   Olga Korosteleva
  Svetlana Abrosimova
  Anna Arkhipova
  Maria Stepanova
  Ann Wauters
  Penny Taylor
  Cappie Pondexter
  Hana Horáková
  Małgorzata Dydek
  Maya Moore 
 / Deanna Nolan
  Candace Parker 
  Yolanda Griffith
  Sue Bird
  Diana Gustilina
  Elena Karpova
  DeLisha Milton-Jones
  Ticha Penicheiro
  Sandrine Gruda
  Céline Dumerc
  Audrey Sauret
  Yelena Leuchanka
  Irina Osipova
  Yelena Baranova
  Sílvia Domínguez
  Suzy Batkovic-Brown
  Diana Taurasi
  Brittney Griner

Former coaches
  Zoran Višić

Footnotes

External links
 
FIBA team page

Women's basketball teams in Russia
EuroLeague Women clubs
Basketball teams established in 1938
Sports clubs in Yekaterinburg
Ural Mining and Metallurgical Company